65 Windmill Street, Millers Point is a heritage-listed boarding house and former residence located at 65 Windmill Street, in the inner city Sydney suburb of Millers Point in the City of Sydney local government area of New South Wales, Australia. The property was added to the New South Wales State Heritage Register on 2 April 1999.

History 
Millers Point is one of the earliest areas of European settlement in Australia, and a focus for maritime activities. Three storey terrace built during 1880s, and first tenanted by DoH in 1983.

Description 
Three storey, Victorian Italianate terrace with two storey verandah. Highly decorative parapet. Now a five bedroom boarding house. Storeys: Three; Construction: Painted rendered masonry walls. Corrugated galvanised iron roof. Iron lace balustrading. Painted timber joinery. Style: Victorian Italianate.

The external condition of the property is good.

Modifications and dates 
External: Joinery modified. Building services surface mounted.

Heritage listing 
As at 23 November 2000, this Victorian Italianate terrace was built during the 1880s, and is a significant streetscape element.

It is part of the Millers Point Conservation Area, an intact residential and maritime precinct. It contains residential buildings and civic spaces dating from the 1830s and is an important example of 19th century adaptation of the landscape.

65 Windmill Street, Millers Point was listed on the New South Wales State Heritage Register on 2 April 1999.

See also 

Australian residential architectural styles
1-63 Windmill Street
67 Windmill Street

References

Bibliography

Attribution

External links

 

New South Wales State Heritage Register sites located in Millers Point
Victorian architecture in Sydney
Houses in Millers Point, New South Wales
Articles incorporating text from the New South Wales State Heritage Register
Millers Point, Windmill Street 65
1880s establishments in Australia
Houses completed in 1880
Millers Point Conservation Area